Paul Webster (born 19 September 1952) is a British film producer.

Life and career
Webster has worked both as an independent, and with several production companies. He worked with Working Title Films for five years, setting up their Los Angeles office. Between 1995 and 1997 he was Head of Production for Miramax Films. In 1998 he joined Channel 4 to create Film Four. In 2004 he joined Kudos Film and Television, heading their film unit, Kudos Pictures.

Webster was executive producer, along with Robert Redford and Rebecca Yeldham, of the 2004 film The Motorcycle Diaries, directed by Walter Salles, based on Che Guevara's book The Motorcycle Diaries. Webster was nominated for an Academy Award for Best Picture for the 2007 film Atonement, for which he was also nominated for a BAFTA in the category of "Best British Film" and won a BAFTA for "Best Film". He has previously been nominated for a BAFTA and a Genie Award for Best Motion Picture for his work on the 2007 film Eastern Promises. Webster produced the Disneynature documentary on flamingos, The Crimson Wing: Mystery of the Flamingos, released internationally in 2009.

Filmography
He was a producer in all films unless otherwise noted.

Film

Production manager

Miscellaneous crew

Thanks

Television

Production manager

References

External links

1952 births
Living people
British film producers
Filmmakers who won the Best Film BAFTA Award
Place of birth missing (living people)